The 2022 Argentina rugby union tours of Great Britain is the tour by the Argentina national team on the United Kingdom that included a series of matches played in the British Isles. After playing the 10th. edition of The Rugby Championship, Argentina went on a tour to play England, Wales, and Scotland national teams.

In the first test, Argentina beat England 30–29 at Twickenham, achieving their second win in England in Los Pumas''' history. The team's win also ended with a tenure of 16 years with no wins over England. Emiliano Boffelli was the key player of the match with 25 points scored.

The second test was played v Wales, who defeated Argentina 20–13 in Cardiff. It was the 22nd match between both sides, with 14 wins for Wales and 6 for Argentina.Los Pumas y su historial ante Gales on ESPN, 11 Nov 2022

Argentina finished the tour with a crushing defeat at the hands of Scotland, which beat them 52–29 at Murrayfield Stadium. Scotland scored 8 tries while Argentina had one player sent off (Marcos Kremer) plus three players were shown yellow cards.

 Background 
It was Argentina's second tour of 2022 after the 2-test tour of New Zealand as part of the 2022 Rugby Championship, held in August and September. Argentina played six games, with 2 wins and 4 loses. Their tour of New Zealand included a first ever win on New Zealand soil, by a score of 25-18 at Christchurch, which was the second win over the All Blacks'' and the first as visitor team.
Their second test match in against New Zealand however, resulted in a crushing 53-3 defeat.

Match summary

Match details

First test

Second test

Third test

References 

Argentina national rugby union team tours
t
t
t
t
Rugby union tours of England
Rugby union tours of Wales
Rugby union tours of Scotland